In meteorology, a snow day is a day on which fall of snow is observed.  A meteorological day is considered on a different basis from country to country. Most frequently, it refers to the 08.00-08.00 time span (summer time: 09.00-09.00).

See also 
 Weather-related cancellation

References 

Meteorological phenomena
Snow